Štěpán Krunert (born 23 March 2000) is a Czech professional football midfielder currently playing for FK Dukla Prague.

Career
He scored his first career goal in Dukla's 3–2 away loss to Příbram in the last match of the 2018–19 Czech First League.

References

External links 
 
 Štěpán Krunert at FAČR

2000 births
Living people
Czech footballers
Czech Republic youth international footballers
Czech Republic under-21 international footballers
Association football midfielders
Czech First League players
Czech National Football League players
FC Sellier & Bellot Vlašim players
SK Benešov players
Bohemians 1905 players
FK Dukla Prague players
FK Teplice players